Altina Wildlife Park is a zoo situated in Darlington Point, New South Wales, Australia. The zoo specialises in the conservation of endangered species and features a diverse range of Australian native and exotic animals. It operates horse-drawn cart tours and offers behind the scenes wildlife encounters.

List of species 

 Addax
 African lion (including white-coated)
 African wild dog
 Alpaca
 American alligator
 American bison
 Asian water buffalo
 Banteng
 Barbary sheep
 Bare-nosed wombat
 Blackbuck
 Brown capuchin monkey
 Capybara
 Common fallow deer
 Common red deer
 Dingo
 Dromedary camel
 Emperor tamarin
 Freshwater crocodile
 Giraffe
 Himalayan tahr
 Indian hog deer
 Javan rusa deer
 Maned wolf
 Meerkat
 Nyala
 Ostrich
 Plains zebra
 Przewalski's horse
 Red panda
 Ring-tailed lemur
 Saltwater crocodile
 Scimitar-horned oryx
 Scottish highland cattle
 Serval
 South American coati
 Southern eland
 Southern white rhinoceros
 Spotted hyena
 Tasmanian devil
 Wapiti deer
 Waterbuck
 White-tufted marmoset
 Yellow-footed rock wallaby

References

External links

Zoos in New South Wales
Wildlife parks in Australia